White Swan may refer to:
Any one of several species of swan
White Swan, Washington, a census-designated place in Yakima County, Washington
White Swan, Crow Indian Scout
The White Swan, a 19th-century establishment in London, England
Tupolev Tu-160 (NATO reporting name: Blackjack), a Russian bomber, nicknamed 'White Swan'
White Swan (prison), a maximum security prison in Solikamsk, Russia
SS White Swan, a steamship which was wrecked in June 1862 while carrying members of New Zealand's parliament
 162 pubs in Britain are named "White Swan".